Ethyl decanoate, also known as ethyl caprate, is a fatty acid ester formed from capric acid and ethanol.  This ester is a frequent product of fermentation during winemaking, especially at temperatures above 15°C.

References

Decanoate esters
Ethyl esters
Fatty acid esters